This is a list of years in Albania. See also the timeline of Albanian history.  For only articles about years in Albania that have been written, see :Category:Years in Albania.

Twenty-first century

Twentieth century

Nineteenth century

See also 
 Timeline of Albanian history
 List of years by country

 
Albania history-related lists
Albania